China National Highway 324 (G324) runs west from Fuzhou, Fujian towards Guangdong Province, Guangxi Province, Guizhou Province, and ends in Kunming, Yunnan Province. It is 2,712 kilometres in length.

Route and distance

See also 

 China National Highways

Transport in Fujian
Transport in Guangxi
Transport in Guangdong
Transport in Guizhou
Transport in Yunnan
324